Westminster North is a constituency represented in the House of Commons of the UK Parliament since its 2010 recreation by Karen Buck, a member of the Labour Party.  Its previous 1983 to 1997 existence is also covered by this article.

Constituency profile
Comprising the northwestern part of the City of Westminster, the constituency contains some affluent residential areas that have historically voted Conservative in large numbers, such as Bayswater and the area on the western and northwestern sides of Regent's Park.

Lord's Cricket Ground and the Abbey Road Studios are in the seat, as are the Queen's Park, Church Street, Westbourne Park, and Harrow Road areas, further from central London. However, the seat has mostly been represented at local level by Conservative councillors, via the wards of Little Venice, Regent's Park, Abbey Road and Lancaster Gate, while Maida Vale and Bayswater have had split representation.

Reflective of the transport links to the selective professional industries of the City of London and long-standing desirable housing in this area, workless claimants who were registered jobseekers were in November 2012 lower than the national average of 3.8%, at 2.9% of the population, based on a statistical compilation by The Guardian.

History

1983–1997
The seat was created under the Third Periodic Review of constituencies in 1983, which followed the first Boundary Commission Review in 1945, which in turn directly followed the Representation of the People Act 1918 review. It was based largely on Paddington but also took in the abolished St Marylebone constituency.

Political history
The seat was held with modest majorities for the first creation, made up of three terms, by John Wheeler, a Conservative. Paddington constituency, its main predecessor was often marginal: by length of a single party's representation and by majorities achieved.  The far less contributory precursor, St Marylebone, was a Conservative safe seat.

The 1997 boundary changes expanded the constituency to the west, taking in Labour-voting areas of north Kensington and tilting the seat towards Labour. Wheeler decided that he did not wish to contest such unfavourable territory and sought selection elsewhere. However he was unsuccessful in finding a new safe seat and thus retired at the 1997 general election.

2010 to date
Political history 
The seat was tipped in mainstream newspapers to be likely to achieve the necessary notional swing based on the same area's votes in the previous election, in 2005, to fall to the Conservative candidate; however the seat fell short of the national average swing and was accordingly won by Karen Buck.  The 2015 result gave the seat the 21st most marginal majority of Labour's 232 seats by percentage of majority. In the 2017 general election, Karen Buck increased her majority over Lindsey Hall, the Conservative Party candidate, from 1,977 to 11,512.

Boundaries

The seat has electoral wards:
Abbey Road; Bayswater; Church Street; Harrow Road; Lancaster Gate; Little Venice; Maida Vale; Queen's Park; Regent's Park; and Westbourne in the City of Westminster.

History of boundaries
From 1983 to 1997 the constituency had the wards:
Bayswater; Church Street; Hamilton Terrace; Harrow Road; Lancaster Gate; Little Venice; Lords; Maida Vale; Queen's Park; Regent's Park; and Westbourne.

Parliament accepted the Boundary Commission's Fifth Periodic Review of Westminster constituencies which called for the recreation of this constituency for the 2010 general election. This was achieved from parts of two seats: the eastern three quarters of Regent's Park and Kensington North and northern parts of Cities of London and Westminster:
Lancaster Gate ward (that part of Bayswater closest to Hyde Park)
A major part of a shared ward next to this, Bayswater
Loss of a minor part of a shared ward, Bryanston and Dorset Square, centred on Baker Street.

Population expansion across the former main seat was a factor, including Maida Vale, West Kilburn and to a lesser degree in St John's Wood, which were retained, as well as in Notting Hill and North Kensington, which were therefore removed.

Members of Parliament

Election results

Elections in the 2010s

Elections 1983–1992

See also
 Kensington (UK Parliament constituency)
 Cities of London and Westminster (UK Parliament constituency)

Notes

References

External links 
Politics Resources (Election results from 1922 onwards)
Electoral Calculus (Election results from 1955 onwards)

Parliamentary constituencies in London (historic)
Parliamentary constituencies in London
Constituencies of the Parliament of the United Kingdom established in 1983
Constituencies of the Parliament of the United Kingdom disestablished in 1997
Constituencies of the Parliament of the United Kingdom established in 2010